Sulfotransferase family cytosolic 2B member 1 is an enzyme that in humans is encoded by the SULT2B1 gene.

Sulfotransferase enzymes catalyze the sulfate conjugation of many hormones, neurotransmitters, drugs, and xenobiotic chemical compounds. These cytosolic enzymes are different in their tissue distributions and substrate specificities. The gene structure (number and length of exons) is similar among family members. This gene sulfates dehydroepiandrosterone but not 4-nitrophenol, a typical substrate for the phenol and estrogen sulfotransferase subfamilies. Two alternatively spliced variants that encode different isoforms have been described.

See also
 Steroid sulfotransferase
 Steroidogenic enzyme

References

Further reading